Gilbert Lea (December 16, 1912 – May 4, 2008) was an American football player, advertising executive and publisher.

Biography
Lea was born in Bala Cynwyd, Pennsylvania, and grew up in Wynnewood. His father was Langdon "Biffy" Lea, one of the greatest football players in the history of Princeton University — a three time consensus All-American tackle who went on to be a head football coach at Princeton and the University of Michigan. A history of Princeton football notes that Gilbert Lea was a "tiger from birth," as his father raised him to play football "as he had ... all out."

Lea attended St. Paul's School, a private preparatory school in Concord, New Hampshire. At St. Paul's Lea was captain of the football team and received the Gordon Medal as the school's best all-around athlete. Lea next enrolled at Princeton University.  

Following in his father's footsteps, Lea became a star of the Princeton football teams from 1933-35. He played at the end position for Princeton teams coached by College Football Hall of Famer Fritz Crisler. Crisler's teams, with Lea at end, were ranked No. 1 in the nation in both 1933 and 1935. In 1935, Lea was a consensus second-team All-American, including spots on the All-American teams selected by the Associated Press and the New York Sun.

During World War II, Lea served in the U.S. Army as an artillery instructor at Fort Sill, Oklahoma and then with the 13th Armored Division.  He was later sent to Europe as a battalion commander of an armored artillery unit attached to the Third Army commanded by General George Patton.

After World War II, Lea worked in the publishing and advertising business for most of his life, for Time magazine (1936–1948), Business Week, McGraw-Hill, and McCall's magazine.  From 1957-67, Lea worked at Ogilvy & Mather as vice president in charge of new business. 

In 1967, Lea purchased the Tower Publishing Company of Portland, Maine, which he operated until 1982. Lea moved to Vero Beach, Florida in 1982. He died there at age 95 in 2008.

See also

 1935 College Football All-America Team

References

External links

1912 births
2008 deaths
American football ends
Princeton Tigers football players
United States Army personnel of World War II
United States Army officers
People from Lower Merion Township, Pennsylvania
Players of American football from Pennsylvania
Military personnel from Pennsylvania